Masdevallia agaster is a species of epiphytic orchid endemic to southern Ecuador.

References

External links 

agaster
Endemic orchids of Ecuador